Erub Island is a locality in the Torres Strait Island Region, Queensland, Australia. The locality consists only of Darnley Island (also known as Erub Island).

Education 
Tagai State College operates across 17 campuses on the Torres Strait Islands. The Darnley Island has a primary (Early Childhood-6) campus of Tagai State College.

See also
Torres Strait Islanders

References 

Torres Strait Island Region
Localities in Queensland